The Series A banknotes are considered to "count amongst the most iconic and beautiful of all modern banknotes." They were the first banknotes created by and for the Irish Free State in 1928 and continued to be issued when the Free State became Ireland. The series is known as "The Lady Lavery Series", from the prominent portrait on the front of the notes. The notes were issued from 1928 to 1977 until they were gradually replaced by Series B banknotes beginning in 1976. However, as no £100 note was issued in Series B, the Series A £100 note remained in use until replaced by the Series C note in 1996.

Banknotes
The Currency Commission of the Irish Free State prescribed the design of the notes and received advice from an advisory commission. Waterlow and Sons, Limited, London printed the notes on behalf of the commission. The series consists of notes in seven denominations: 10s, £1, £5, £10, £20, £50 and £100.

Each note has a portrait of Lady Lavery – wife of the artist Sir John Lavery, who was commissioned to design this feature. The original oil on canvas painting of Lady Lavery, titled Portrait of Lady Lavery as Kathleen Ni Houlihan (1927), is displayed at the National Gallery of Ireland on loan from the Central Bank of Ireland. From the description of Lady Lavery's portrait at the National Gallery:

The banknote design placed the portrait on the left of the banknotes, so the image from the painting was reversed to face right. The full portrait appears on the larger £10, £20, £50 and £100 notes but is reduced to a head and shoulders version on the smaller 10s, £1 and £5 notes. The head from the portrait was later used as a watermark on the Series B and Series C banknotes until 2002.

The watermark on all Series A banknotes is the "Head of Erin" taken from the statue, Hibernia with the Bust of Lord Cloncurry (1844), sculpted in Rome by John Hogan and brought to Ireland in 1846. The statue depicts Ireland, represented by the allegorical female figure of Hibernia, also known as “Erin”, with her arm around a bust of Lord Cloncurry. Hogan modeled the female figure after his Italian wife, Cornelia Bevignani. This statue is considered by some authorities to be Hogan’s masterpiece. and "one of the finest examples of Irish neoclassical sculpture". The statue is in the collection of University College Dublin and is located at Belfield House.  

The reverse of each denomination features the head of a "River God" representing one of the rivers of Ireland taken from a keystone on the Custom House in Dublin sculpted by Edward Smyth. Rivers in both the Irish Free State and Northern Ireland were chosen.

The Currency Commission notes were printed with Currency Commission/Coimisiún Airgid Reatha and Irish Free State/Saorstát Éireann with facsimiles of the signatures of the Chairman of the Currency Commission/Cathaoirleach Choimisiúin an Airgid Reatha  and of the Secretary of the Department of Finance/Rúnaí na Roinne Airgid. When the Constitution of Ireland had legal effect Ireland was substituted for Irish Free State, Éire for Saorstát Éireann.

In 1943 additional changes were made when the Central Bank Act of 1942 gave legal effect. The Currency Commission was replaced with Central Bank of Ireland/Banc Ceannais na hÉireann on the notes and the signature of the chairman was replaced with that of Governor/An Ghobharnóir.

Banknotes produced during the Second World War were overprinted with different letters so that particular batches could be identified and removed from circulation if they were lost in transit between the printers in Britain and Dublin. The promise of exchange in London was removed from the notes in 1961. A metal security thread was added to the £1, £5 and £10 notes in 1971.

† No £100 note was issued in Series B. The Series A £100 note remained in use until the Series C £100 note was issued in 1996.

Footnotes

External links
Central Bank of Ireland – Notes & Coins Series A
      Spink Special Features: The Story of Hazel, Lady Lavery: The woman behind the banknote classic

Currencies of the Republic of Ireland
Ireland A